The diving competitions at the 2016 Summer Olympics in Rio de Janeiro took place from 7 to 20 August at Maria Lenk Aquatic Center in Barra da Tijuca. It was one of four aquatic sports at the Games, along with swimming, water polo, and synchronised swimming.

The 2016 Games featured competitions in eight events (men and women events each of): 3m springboard, synchronised 3m springboard, 10m platform, and synchronised 10m platform.

The diving competitions featured up to 136 athletes. All divers had to be at least 14 years old on or by 31 December 2016.

On Tuesday August 9, the water of the diving well turned dark green, originally thought to be caused by the heat and lack of wind in the venue. However, at the time a CNN photographer took a picture, an adjacent pool in the same location was not green. Olympic officials later confirmed that the change in color was due to 160 litres of hydrogen peroxide having been mistakenly added to the pool during cleaning.

For the eighth consecutive Games, China dominated the medal table, and for the fourth occasion in that period were denied a clean sweep of diving golds by a single event; in this case, the 3 metre synchronised men's event won by Great Britain's Jack Laugher and Chris Mears, their nation's first ever gold medalists in the discipline.

Qualification

A nation could have no more than 16 divers qualify (up to eight males and eight females) and could enter up to two divers in individual events and one pair in synchronized events.

For the individual diving events, qualifiers were:
the top 12 finishers in each event from the 2015 World Championships,
the five continental champions in each event, and
up to 18 semi-finalists from the 2016 FINA Diving World Cup.

For the synchronized events (pairs), qualifiers were:
the top three finishers in each event from the 2015 World Championships,
the top four from in each event the 2016 World Cup, and
the host nation (Brazil).

Note: Qualifying spots went to the nation – they were not tied to the individual diver who achieved the place/finish at the qualifying event. However, an individual diver might only qualify one spot for their nation.

Participating nations
136 athletes represented 29 nations in Diving at the 2016 Olympics:

Schedule

All times are Brasília Time (UTC-3)

Medalists

Medal table

Men

Women

References

External links

 
 
 Results Book – Diving

 
2016 Summer Olympics events
2016
2016 in diving
Diving competitions in Brazil
International aquatics competitions hosted by Brazil